Rho Virginis (ρ Vir, ρ Virginis) is the Bayer designation for a star in the constellation Virgo. It has an apparent visual magnitude of +4.9, making it a challenge to view with the naked eye from an urban area (according to the Bortle Dark-Sky Scale).

Rho Virginis is an A-type main sequence star with a stellar classification of A0 V. It is larger than the Sun with a radius 60% larger and about twice the mass. As such it is generating energy at a higher rate than the Sun, with a luminosity 14 times greater. The outer atmosphere has an effective temperature of 8,930 K, which is what gives it the white-hued glow of an A-type star. It is classified as a Delta Scuti type variable star and its brightness varies by 0.02 magnitudes over periods of 0.5 to 2.4 hours.

This star has been established as a Lambda Boötis star that displays low abundances of iron peak elements. It displays an excess of infrared emission, but it is unclear whether this is being caused by a circumstellar debris disk or from the star passing through and heating up a diffuse interstellar dust cloud. Most likely it is the former, in which case the dusty disk has a radius of around 37 AU and a mean temperature of 90 K.

References

Virginis, Rho
Virgo (constellation)
Delta Scuti variables
A-type main-sequence stars
Virginis, 030
061960
4828
110411
Durchmusterung objects